Ladislao Vajda (born Weisz László; 18 August 1906, Budapest – 25 March 1965, Barcelona) was a Hungarian-Spanish film director who made films in Spain, Portugal, the United Kingdom, Italy and West Germany.

Biography
He was born in Budapest, his father being an actor and screenwriter.

Vajda started his career as film editor (even though he also worked as artistic designer and writer) for different directors, such as Billy Wilder and Henry Koster. Eventually, he undertook his first directorial effort in his native country, Hungary.

Finally, he moved to Spain, where he continued directing films. The first film from his Spanish period was Se vende un palacio (A Palace for Sale), released in 1943. During the 1940s, Vajda directed several movies in Portugal, United Kingdom and, mainly, in Spain.

However, he would reach his artistic peak in the 1950s. Vajda's movies during this period are clearly influenced by the German director Fritz Lang. His main works during this period are: Miracle of Marcelino (1955), Uncle Hyacynth (1956), Afternoon of the Bulls (1956), The Man Who Wagged His Tail (1957) with Peter Ustinov, and It Happened in Broad Daylight (1958). They were acclaimed by both critics and public: The Miracle of Marcelino and Uncle Hyacynth won different prizes in Cannes Film Festival and Berlin Film Festival; Afternoon of the Bulls was nominated for the Palme d'Or and It Happened in Broad Daylight for the Golden Bear.

During the 1960s, Vajda worked on several different minor works in West Germany and Spain. He died in Barcelona in 1965.

Filmography
 
 The Beggar Student (1931)
 The Woman They Talk About (1931)
 My Heart Longs for Love (1931)
 Once There Was a Waltz (1932)
 A Bit of Love (1932)
 Where Is This Lady? (1932)
 Love on Skis (1933)
 Ball at the Savoy (1935)
 Haut comme trois pommes (1935)
 Szenzáció (1936)
 Ember a híd alatt (1936)
 Három sárkány (1936)
 Cafe Moscow (1936)
 Wings Over Africa (1937)
 The Wife of General Ling (1937)
 A kölcsönkért kastély (1937)
  (1937)
 Princess Tarakanova (1938)
 Magda Expelled (1938)
 Döntő pillanat (1938)
 Black Diamonds (1938)
 Rézi Friday (1938)
 La zia smemorata (1940)
  (1941)
 A Palace for Sale (1942)
 Doce lunas de miel (1944)
 Te quiero para mí (1944)
 El Testamento del virrey (1944)
 O Diabo São Elas (1945)
 Cinco lobitos (1945)
 Tres espejos (1947)
 Viela, Rua Sem Sol (1947)
 Barrio (1947)
 Call of the Blood (1948)
 The Golden Madonna (1949)
 Séptima página (1950)
 Sin uniforme (1950)
 The Woman with No Name (1950)
 Spanish Serenade (1952)
 Doña Francisquita (1953)
 Carne de horca (1953)
 Aventuras del barbero de Sevilla (1954)
 Marcelino pan y vino (1955)
 Tarde de toros (1956)
 Mi tío Jacinto (1956)
 Un ángel pasó por Brooklyn (1957)
 It Happened in Broad Daylight (1958)
 The Man Who Walked Through the Wall (1959)
 Maria, Registered in Bilbao (1960)
 The Shadows Grow Longer (1961)
 The Liar (1961)
 The Lightship (1963)
 A Nearly Decent Girl (1963)
 La Dama de Beirut (1965)

References

External links
 
 

1906 births
1965 deaths
Film people from Budapest
Hungarian film directors
German-language film directors
Hungarian emigrants to Spain